The Snell Arcade (also known as the Rutland Building) is a historic site in St. Petersburg, Florida. The building was designed by the architect Richard Kiehnel of Kiehnel and Elliott. Built in 1926, it is located at 405 Central Avenue.  On November 4, 1982, it was added to the U.S. National Register of Historic Places.  The Snell Arcade was developed by C. Perry Snell, a wealthy landowner and philanthropist.

References

External links
 Pinellas County listings at National Register of Historic Places
 Florida's Office of Cultural and Historical Programs
 Pinellas County listings
 Snell Arcade
 St. Petersburg Historical Trail at Florida Trails
 Snell Arcade history

National Register of Historic Places in Pinellas County, Florida
Buildings and structures in St. Petersburg, Florida
Buildings and structures completed in 1926
Kiehnel and Elliott buildings
1926 establishments in Florida